Title 28 (Judiciary and Judicial Procedure) is the portion of the United States Code (federal statutory law) that governs the federal judicial system.

It is divided into six parts:
 Part I: Organization of Courts 
 Part II: Department of Justice
 Part III: Court Officers and Employees
 Part IV: Jurisdiction and Venue
 Part V: Procedure
 Part VI: Particular Proceedings

Part I—Organization of Courts
The part establishes United States federal courts.

 : Supreme Court
 Includes provisions setting the number of justices at 9 and defining a quorum as any 6, setting the terms of court, and determining salaries
 : Courts of Appeals
 Includes provisions relating to the composition of Circuits, the creation, composition and terms of courts, and the selection and employment conditions of judges
 : District Courts
 Describes for each state the layout of districts, divisions etc; describes the creation and composition of courts and the selection and employment conditions of judges; provides for replacement of judges in cases of bias or prejudice
 : Bankruptcy judges
 : United States Court of Federal Claims
 : United States Court of Customs and Patent Appeals (repealed October 1, 1982)
 : Court of International Trade
 : Assignment of judges to other courts
 : Conferences and councils of judges
 : Resignation and retirement of justices and judges
 : Distribution of reports and digests
 : General provisions applicable to courts and judges
 : Civil justice expense and delay reduction plans

Part II—Department of Justice
The part establishes the United States Department of Justice.

 : The Attorney General
 : Federal Bureau of Investigation
 : United States Attorneys
 : United States Marshals Service
 : United States Trustees
 : Independent Counsel
 : Bureau of Alcohol, Tobacco, Firearms and Explosives

Part III—Court Officers and Employees
 : Administrative Office of United States Courts
 : Federal Judicial Center
 : United States Magistrate Judge
 : Alternative Dispute Resolution
 : Supreme Court
 : Courts of Appeals (also called circuit courts)
 : District Courts
 : [Omitted]
 : United States Court of Federal Claims (hears non-tort monetary claims against the U.S. government)
 : [Repealed] (United States Court of Customs and Patent Appeals)
 : Court of International Trade
 : General Provisions Applicable to Court Officers and Employees
 : United States Sentencing Commission

Part IV—Jurisdiction and Venue
This part deals with jurisdiction and venue.

 : Supreme Court
 : Courts of Appeals
 : District Courts; Jurisdiction
 : District Courts; Venue
 : District Courts; Removal of Cases from State Courts
 : [Omitted]
 : United States Court of Federal Claims
 : [Repealed] (United States Court of Customs and Patent Appeals)
 : Court of International Trade
 : Jurisdictional Immunities of Foreign States
 : General Provisions

Part V—Procedure
This part establishes criminal procedure and civil procedure for the federal courts. The Supreme Court, pursuant to the Rules Enabling Act and upon recommendations from the Judicial Conference of the United States, promulgates the more detailed Federal Rules of Civil Procedure and Federal Rules of Criminal Procedure

 : General Provisions
 : Process
 : Class Actions
 : Evidence; Documentary
 : Evidence; Depositions
 : Evidence; Witnesses
 : Juries; Trial by Jury
 : Fees and Costs
 : Pending Actions and Judgments
 : Executions and Judicial Sales
 : Money Paid into Court
 : Rules of Court
 : Review—Miscellaneous Provisions

Part VI—Particular Proceedings
 : Declaratory Judgments
 : Habeas Corpus
 : Special Habeas Corpus Procedures for Capital Cases
 : Injunctions; Three-Judge Courts
 : Surface Transportation Board Orders; Enforcement and Review
 : Orders of Federal Agencies; Review
 : Interpleader
 : United States as Party Generally
 : Fines, Penalties, and Forfeitures
 : United States Court of Federal Claims Procedure
 : [Repealed]
 : Court of International Trade Procedure
 : Tort Claims Procedure
 : Attachment in Postal Suits
 : [Repealed]
 : Federal Debt Collection Procedures
 : Professional and Amateur Sports Protection
 : Judicial Review of Certain Actions by Presidential Offices
 : Assumption of Certain Contractual Obligations

External links
U.S. Code Title 28, via United States Government Printing Office
Text of Title 28 of the U.S. Code at Cornell's Legal Information Institute

28
Title 28